Modern Thrills is the first studio album by Tesla Boy, first released on May 31, 2010.

Background

Reception

Modern Thrills has received generally favorable reviews.

Track listing

Personnel
 Anton Sevidov – vocal, keyboards
 Dima Midborn – bass
 Poko Cox – guitar
 Mikhail Studnitsyn – drums

References

External links
 

2010 albums
Tesla Boy albums